The Liberia women's national under-18 basketball team is a national basketball team of Liberia, administered by the Liberia Basketball Federation.
It represents the country in international under-18 (under age 18) women's basketball competitions.

It appeared at the 2010 FIBA Africa Under-18 Championship for Women qualification stage.

See also
Liberia women's national basketball team
Liberia men's national under-18 basketball team

References

External links
Archived records of Liberia team participations

Basketball in Liberia
Basketball teams in Liberia
Women's national under-18 basketball teams
Basketball
Women's sport in Liberia